The 19th Special Operations Group "Caballero Legionario Maderal Oleaga" (Spanish:Grupo de Operaciones Especiales "Caballero Legionario Maderal Oleaga" XIX), GOE XIX, is one of the three currently existing Special Operations Groups and so is subordinated to the Special Operations Command. It was the former Special Forces unit of the Spanish Legion and was known as Bandera de Operaciones Especiales de la Legión (Legion Special Operations Bandera (battalion)), BOEL.

The members of this unit received training in:

 SCUBA/Maritime Warfare
 Arctic and Mountain Warfare
 Sabotage and Demolitions
 Parachute and HALO techniques
 Long Range Reconnaissance
 Counter-terrorism and CQB
 Vehicle insertion
 Sniping
 SERE (Survival, Escape, Resistance and Evasion)

In 2002 the BOEL was renamed Grupo de Operaciones Especiales "Caballero Legionario Maderal Oleaga" XIX and was moved to Alicante as unit of the Special Operations Command of the Spanish Army. GOE XIX currently accepts applicants from other light infantry units and no longer forms part of the Legion.

See also 
Special Operations Groups of the Spanish Army
Special Operations Command of the Spanish Army
Spanish Legion

References

Special forces of Spain